Borax is a ghost town and railroad siding in Clark County, Nevada, United States located along the Union Pacific Railroad east of Interstate 15.

History
Borax was settled in 1905, and named for the borax deposits in the region. In  1940, the population of Borax was 10.

As of 2021, there are no buildings that remain in Borax and the site exists as a railroad siding along the Union Pacific Railroad.

References

Geography of Clark County, Nevada
History of the Mojave Desert region
Union Pacific Railroad stations
Ghost towns in Clark County, Nevada